Tarn Taran may refer to:

 Tarn Taran Sahib, a city in Tarn Taran district, Punjab, India
 Tarn Taran district, a district in Punjab, India
 Tarn Taran, Pakistan, a village in Punjab, Pakistan
 Tarn Taran (Lok Sabha constituency)
 Tarn Taran (Assembly Constituency)

See also 
 Taran (disambiguation)
 Tarn (disambiguation)